The 3rd Discover Screenwriting Award, given by the American Screenwriters Association, honored the best screenwriter(s) of 2003.

Winner and nominees
 Antwone Q. Fisher – Antwone Fisher
 Sofia Coppola – Lost in Translation
 Richard Curtis – Love Actually
 Brian Helgeland – Mystic River
 Andrew Stanton, Bob Peterson, and David Reynolds – Finding Nemo

American Screenwriters Association Awards
2003 film awards